Roberto Pelliconi (born 14 November 1962) is a former Italian racing cyclist. He rode at the 1988 Summer Olympics and participated in eight Grand Tours.

Palmares

1988
7th Olympic Road Race
1989
1st Trofeo Matteotti
3rd New Jersey National Bank Classic
1990
2nd Gran Premio Città di Camaiore
2nd National Road Race Championships
1992
1st First Union Invitational
3rd Milano-Vignola
1993
2nd Coca-Cola Trophy
3rd Grand Prix du Midi Libre

References

1962 births
Living people
Italian male cyclists
Cyclists at the 1988 Summer Olympics
Olympic cyclists of Italy
People from Imola
Sportspeople from the Metropolitan City of Bologna
Cyclists from Emilia-Romagna